Hu Wei (born 1983 in Beijing) is a Chinese filmmaker.

Biography 
Hu Wei studied art at the Ecole Nationale Supérieure des Beaux-Arts de Paris ENSBA, as well as at Le Fresnoy - Studio national des arts contemporains in northern France.

His short film Butter Lamp (La lampe au beurre de yak) enjoyed great international success, premiering in the Critic's Week section at the Cannes Festival in 2013 and subsequently screening at numerous other festivals, including the Rotterdam and Sundance Film Festivals, and winning more than 70 awards, including an Academy Award nomination for best live action short film.

In 2014-15, he was a fellow at the Villa Médicis - Académie de France in Rome. In 2015, he participated in the «Next Step» program by Cannes' Critic's Week.

His next short film, What tears us apart (Ce qui nous éloigne), starring Isabelle Huppert, premiered at the Venice International Film Festival in 2016.

Hu Wei lives and works in China and France.

Filmography 

 2012: Le propriétaire (short film)
 2013: Butter Lamp (La lampe au beurre de yak, short film)
 2016: What tears us apart (Ce qui nous éloigne, short film)

Awards

Butter Lamp (a selection) 

 2013: Discovery Award at Critic's Week Cannes (nomination)
 2013: International Short Film Festival Winterthur, Main award of the international competition as well as audience award
 2013: European Film Award: best short film (nomination)
 2014: Clermont-Ferrand International Short Film Festival, Grand Prix
 2015: Academy Awards, Best Live Action Short Film (nomination)

References

External links

Chinese film directors
French film directors
Living people
1983 births